GPD1L is a human gene. The protein encoded by this gene contains a glycerol-3-phosphate dehydrogenase (NAD+) motif and shares 72% sequence identity with GPD1.

Structure
GPD1L contains the following domains:
 N-terminal – NAD+ consensus binding site
 a site homologous to the cardiac sodium channel SCN5A
 C-terminal lysine-206 residue

Tissue distribution
Northern blot analysis detected a single GPD1L transcript in all tissues examined except liver. Highest expression was in heart and skeletal muscle.

Disease linkage
Mutations in the GPD1L gene are associated with the Brugada syndrome and sudden infant death syndrome.

See also
 Glycerol-3-phosphate dehydrogenase

References

External links
  GeneReviews/NIH/NCBI/UW entry on Brugada syndrome
 A Systems Genetics Approach Identified GPD1L and its Molecular Mechanism for Obesity in Human Adipose Tissue